Quilmes Atlético Club Women is the women's association football section of the homonymous club based in the city of Quilmes, in Greater Buenos Aires. The team was established in 2020.

They play their home games at the youth football complex, known as "Alsina y Lora", where the junior teams also play their games.

History

Formation
The women's football section of Quilmes was established on 28 August 2020, when the club began registration for the test of players of the professional team, which would begin to participate in the Primera División C in 2021. Due to the COVID-19 pandemic in Argentina, the said tests would only be carried out between 23 and 25 November.

First match
Quilmes played their first two friendly matches against Asociación Nueva Alianza (team from La Plata). The first match ended 1-1, with a goal from Mía González who had entered minutes before. In the second game, Las Cerveceras were defeated 2-1 with a goal from Florencia Cristaldo.

References

External links
 

Quilmes Atlético Club
Association football clubs established in 2020
Women's football clubs in Argentina
2020 establishments in Argentina
Football clubs in Buenos Aires Province